Club Sportif Sfaxien is a Tunisian professional association football club founded in 1928.

History
The club was founded in 1928 as Club Tunisien, playing in green and red stripes. The team was promoted to the Tunisian First Division in 1947. In 1950, the first supporters group was founded by Béchir Fendri, and in 1962 the club was renamed " Club Sportif Sfaxien " and team colours were changed to the current black and white stripes.

CSS celebrated their half-centenary in 1978 by winning the Tunisian League title, largely thanks to the impressive performances of their Tunisian internationals, notably Hammadi Agrebi, Mohamed Ali Akid and Mokhtar Dhouib.
In November 1998, CSS captured the CAF Cup for the first time, beating Senegal's ASC Jeanne d'Arc in the final.

In more recent times, CSS reached the final of the CAF Champions League 2006 but were narrowly beaten in dramatic fashion, with a late second leg goal condemning them to a 2–1 aggregate defeat against Al Ahly of Egypt.

In September 2014, CSS reached the semi-finals of the CAF Champions League 2014 but they were beaten with a 2–1 score in both away and home matches against AS Vita Club.

In May 2015, CSS got disqualified from The CAF Champions League 2015 after a loss with 1–0 in their away match against Mouloudia Chabab El Eulma(Algeria) and then CSS won their match in Sfax with 1–0 at the Stade Taïeb Mhiri but they got disqualified since they lost by penalties (7–6).

CSS won the 2007 CAF Confederation Cup. A 4–2 first-leg victory in Sudan against Al Merreikh preceded a 1–0 second leg win, with CSS lifting the trophy in front of their own fans at the Stade Taïeb Mhiri.
In November 2008, CSS faced local rivals Etoile du Sahel (ESS) in the final of the CAF Confederation Cup. CSS became the most successful club in recent history of the tournament when a 0–0 draw in Sfax was followed by a 2–2 draw in Sousse, sending the cup back to Sfax for the second year in a row.

2009 saw the club win the Tunisian Cup.

In 2013, CSS won CAF Confederation Cup for the 3rd time in their history facing TP Mazembe in the final with 2–0 in Rades then a 2–1 defeat in Lubumbashi with a late goal from Fakhreddine Ben Youssef.

Club Sportif Sfaxien is considered by the IFFHS as one of the five best teams in this century.

Club Sfaxien participated in the 2017 CAF Confederation Cup.

In the 2018–19 the club won the Tunisian Cup again. The club won the Tunisian FA Cup for a sixth time on 28 June 2021.

Players

Current squad

Honours 
Source: soccerway.com

Domestic competitions 

Tunisian Ligue Professionnelle 1: 
Winners (8): 1969, 1971, 1978, 1981, 1983, 1995, 2005, 2013

 Tunisian Cup: 
Winners (7): 1971, 1995, 2004, 2009, 2019, 2021, 2022

Tunisian League Cup: 
Winners (1): 2003

African competitions 

 CAF Confederation Cup
Winners (3; Record): 2007, 2008, 2013

 CAF Cup
Winners (1): 1998

Regional competitions 

 Arab Club Champions Cup
Winners (2): 2000, 2004

 North African Cup Winners Cup
Winners: 2009

Performance in CAF competitions
CAF Champions League:

1996 – Semi-finals

2006 – Runner-up
2014 – Semi-finals

CAF Confederation Cup:

2007 – Winner
2008 – Winner
2010 – Runner-up

2012 – First round
2013 – Winner

CAF Super Cup: 3 appearances

2008 – Runner-up
2009 – Runner-up
2014 – Runner-up

CAF Cup: 1 appearance

1998 – Winner

Managers

Presidents

Rival clubs
  ES Tunis (Rivalry)
  Club Africain (Rivalry)
  Étoile Sportive du Sahel (Rivalry)

See also
CS Sfaxien (volleyball)
CS Sfaxien Women's Volleyball
CS Sfaxien Women's Basketball
CS Sfaxien's Official Instagram Page

References

External links
CS Sfaxien at Sofascore

CS Sfaxien
Football clubs in Tunisia
Association football clubs established in 1928
1928 establishments in Tunisia
Sports clubs in Tunisia
CAF Cup winning clubs
CAF Confederation Cup winning clubs